The 1984 Indian vice-presidential election was held on 22 August 1984 to elect Vice-President of India. R. Venkataraman was elected for the post, after he defeated B. C. Kamble in the election.

Result

|- align=center
!style="background-color:#E9E9E9" align=center|Candidate
!style="background-color:#E9E9E9" |Party
!style="background-color:#E9E9E9" |Electoral Votes
!style="background-color:#E9E9E9" |% of Votes
|-
|align="left"|R. Venkataraman||align="left"|INC||508||71.05
|-
|align="left"|B. C. Kamble||align="left"|RPI (K)||207||28.95
|-
| colspan="4" style="background:#e9e9e9;"|
|-
! colspan="2" style="text-align:left;"| Total
! style="text-align:right;"|715
! style="text-align:right;"|100.00
|-
| colspan="4" style="background:#e9e9e9;"| 
|-
|-
|colspan="2" style="text-align:left;"|Valid Votes||715||95.97
|-
|colspan="2" style="text-align:left;"|Invalid Votes||30||4.03
|-
|colspan="2" style="text-align:left;"|Turnout||745||94.54
|-
|colspan="2" style="text-align:left;"|Abstentions||43||5.46
|-
|colspan="2" style="text-align:left;"|Electors||788|| style="background:#e9e9e9;"|
|-
|}

See also
 1982 Indian presidential election

References

External links

Vice-presidential elections in India
India